Clonad GAA is a Gaelic Athletic Association hurling club in County Laois, Ireland which fields teams from Under-10 right up to adult level. While Clonad GAA club has successfully fielded underage and adult Gaelic football teams in the past, football is not played in the club at present. These days, club members interested in football usually play with the neighbouring football clubs at The Heath and Ballyroan.

The club colours are green with a gold sash.

History
Although it is known that a GAA club existed in the area in the late 19th century and that the nearby Barrington estate was a patron of a hurling team in the 18th century, the present club was founded in 1915 by Lar Brady and Jim Bergin to promote hurling in the country area to the south of Portlaoise. Clonad was promoted to the senior grade in 1927 and won its first Laois senior hurling title in 1930. 

The club has added 13 Laois Senior Hurling Championships since then, the most recent being in 1992. Other years are as follows; 1930, 1933, 1935, 1937, 1946, 1947, 1948, 1950, 1953, 1954, 1958, 1962, and 1970. Clonad has also won the O'Bradaigh Cup twice, the Centenary Cup in 1984 and U-21 and minor hurling titles in recent years. 

The captain of the last Laois team to win the Leinster Senior Hurling Championship in 1949 was a Clonad player, Paddy Ruschitzko. Other renowned Clonad players were Andy Bergin, Jack Dick Conroy, Joe McCabe, Joe Styles, Billy Bohane, Andy Dunne, Paddy Norton, Ollie Fennell and George Conroy, who was former chairman of the club.

In the 1950s Clonad won the Laois Junior Football Championship and Laois Intermediate Football Championship. Despite this success the emphasis was always on hurling and football has only featured infrequently since then. 

Recent developments at the club include the construction of a ball wall designed and used for hurling skills which is used by the Laois Senior hurling team and other teams in training drills and was the first of its kind in Laois. Two more additional changing rooms have been built and the club has now formed a camogie club.

The senior team had not performed well in the Laois Senior Hurling Championship in recent years and was relegated to intermediate status for the first time ever in 2008.

Achievements
 Laois Senior Hurling Championship: (14) 1930, 1933, 1935, 1937, 1946, 1947, 1948, 1950, 1953, 1954, 1958, 1962, 1970, 1992

Notable players
 John Killeen
 Pat Roe
 Paddy Ruschitzko
 Peter Conroy

External links

Gaelic games clubs in County Laois
Hurling clubs in County Laois